Stobierna  is a village in the administrative district of Gmina Dębica, within Dębica County, Subcarpathian Voivodeship, in south-eastern Poland.

The population of the village is approximately 1,500.

References

Villages in Dębica County